Ayukashevo (Ayıwqaş) is a rural locality (a village) in Uchpilinsky Selsoviet, Dyurtyulinsky District, Bashkortostan, Russia. The population was 200 as of 2010. There is 1 street.

Geography 
Ayukashevo is located 14 km southeast of Dyurtyuli (the district's administrative centre) by road. Uchpili is the nearest rural locality.

References 

Rural localities in Dyurtyulinsky District